Code Name Abdul is a 2017 Indian Hindi-language spy thriller film directed by Eshwar Gunturu. The film stars Kajol's sister Tanishaa Mukerji in the lead role. The film revolves around a secret mission given to RAW. The film theatrically released on 10 December 2021.

Cast 
The film features the following casts

 Tanishaa Mukerji as Salma
 Ashok Chaudhry as Stalin
 Khatera Hakimi as Mehek
 Sumend Wankhade as Ajay
 Anshuman Sharma as Anwar
 Deepak Ravella as Srinivas
 Anil Sachdeva as Khalid
 Bharat Tiwari as Ali Baksh
 Vikram Singh as Sahab
 Deepen Shah as Major
 Jiten Mehta as Tracker
 Rome Keshav Chopra as Frank
 Adriano Esposito as Jimmy
 Aman Singh Mukar as Nasha
 Ashish Mathur as Seth
 Madhukar Reddy as Jamal
 Akku Kulhari as Johny

Marketing 
The first look poster of the movie was released on 14 September 2019 that featured an image of Tanishaa and the other star-cast in black and white scrapbook style.

References

External links 
 

2017 films
2010s Hindi-language films
Indian spy thriller films
Films about the Research and Analysis Wing
2010s spy thriller films